= Johanna Ludmila Puschmannová =

Johanna Ludmila Maria Puschmannová (died after 1750) was a Czech puppet theatre director. She is also known as Puschmannin or Buschmannin. She is unusual as a woman in her profession.

Her origin is not confirmed, but her name indicates a Czech origin. She is likely to have been the wife or relative of MJ Puschmann from Vienna. When she applied for permission in Prague in February 1748, she stated that she was from Vienna. However, when performing in Leipzig in April 1749, she claimed to be from Prague. She was successful in Prague: when FJ Sebastiani applied for permission to perform stage shows in Prague in 1752, he stated that he was a successor of the renowned "Puschmann Company".
